Philippe-Ignace-Francois Aubert de Gaspé, or simply Philippe Aubert de Gaspé (1814–7 March 1841) was a Canadian writer and is credited with writing the first French Canadian novel.

Career
Philippe-Ignace-Francois was tutored by his father Philippe-Joseph and studied at the seminary of Nicolet. He worked as a journalist at the Quebec Mercury and Le Canadien. He was sentenced to a month in prison in November 1835 after clashing with Edmund Bailey O'Callaghan, who questioned his integrity. In February of the following year, he unleashed a stink bomb of asafoetida at the National Assembly of Quebec.

While lying-low at his father's house he began writing his novel L'influence d'un livre. The story is made up of various fictionalized historical events, legends and folksongs which show the influence of father's recollections. Despite now being recognized as a major landmark in Canadian literature, the book was not well received and Philippe died shortly afterwards in Halifax where he was buried in front of the present-day Spring Garden Road Public Library.

Works
 Le chercheur de trésors ou L'influence d'un livre. roman. 1837 online
 Transl. Claire Holden Rothman: The Influence of a Book. Robert Davies Publ. 1993  John Glassco Translation Award

See also
Aubert de Gaspé (disambiguation), for other members of the family

References

External links
 
 

Canadian male novelists
Writers from Quebec
1841 deaths
1814 births
19th-century Canadian novelists
Canadian novelists in French
19th-century Canadian male writers